

Cape Borda is a locality in the Australian state of South Australia located on Kangaroo Island about  south-west of the state capital of Adelaide.

Its boundaries were created in 2002 in respect to “the long established name” which is reported to be derived from the navigation aid within its boundaries - the Cape Borda Lightstation.

The major land uses within the locality includes conservation and primary production with the former land use including the following protected areas - the Flinders Chase National Park, the Ravine des Casoars Wilderness Protection Area and  the Cape Torrens Wilderness Protection Area.  Part of the southern boundary of Cape Borda is formed by the Playford Highway.

The locality includes the three following state heritage places - Harveys Return Cemetery, the Cape Borda Lighthouse and  the Harveys Return Landing Site.

Cape Borda is located within the federal division of Mayo, the state electoral district of Mawson and the local government area of the Kangaroo Island Council.

References 

Towns on Kangaroo Island